Astra Film Corp was an American film production company that produced silent films. Louis J. Gasnier was the company's president. George B. Seitz co-founded it. It was making films by 1916. It became Louis J. Gasnier Productions after Seitz left.

The studio operated in Jersey City, New Jersey before expanding to Fort Lee, New Jersey.

The Fort Lee studio site at 1 Congress Street was acquired from Pathé in 1916. The company distributed its films with Pathé. Rolin Studio in Los Angeles also worked with Pathé.

The company's Hands Up serial included a storyline featuring the Inca.

The studio produced Pathé's photoplay films including Stranded in Arcady. It was an adaptation of a story by Francis Lynde and starred Irene Castle. It was directed by Frank Hall Crane.

The company also produced The Fatal Ring and The Seven Pearls serials.

Arthur Miller worked for the company. Grace Darmond left Selig to work for the company.

Filmography
At Bay (1915)
Via Wireless (1915)
Pearl of the Army (1916), a serial
The Shielding Shadow (1916)
The Romantic Journey (1916)
The Black Orchid (1916), starring Grace Darmond
Arms and the Woman (1916)
May Blossom (1917)
The Seven Pearls (1917), a serial
The Fatal Ring (1917), a 19-chapter serial
The Hidden Hand (1917), a serial
Kick In (1917)
The Cigarette Girl (1917)
The Mystery of the Double Cross (1917)
Caleb Piper's Girl (1917), starring Helene Chadwick
The Hunting of the Hawk (1917)
Vengeance Is Mine (1917)
Stranded in Arcady (1917)
Hands Up (1918), a serial
The Yellow Ticket (1918)
The House of Hate (1918)
The Honest Thief (1918)
The Mystery of the Doublecross (1918)
The Naulahka (1918)
The Hillcrest Mystery (1918)
The House of Hate (1918), a serial
A Japanese Nightingale (1918)
The Adventures of Ruth (1919)
The Tiger's Trail (1919), a serial
The Lightning Raider (1919)
The Pleasant Devil (1919)
Daredevil Jack (1920)
The Phantom Foe (1920)
Pirate Gold (1920), a serial
The Third Eye (1920), a serial
Trailed by Three (1920)

References

American film studios
Silent film studios
Companies based in Jersey City, New Jersey
Fort Lee, New Jersey